Luau Airport  is an airport serving Luau, a municipality in the Moxico Province of Angola. It is near the border between Angola and the Democratic Republic of the Congo.

In February, 2015, Luau International Airport was opened by Angolan President, José Eduardo dos Santos.

See also

 List of airports in Angola
 Transport in Angola

References

External links
 
 
 OpenStreetMap - Luau

Airports in Angola
Moxico Province